USRC Hamilton  was a Revenue Cutter topsail schooner of the Gallatin class. She was named for Alexander Hamilton, first Secretary of the Treasury. An iron-hulled cutter with steam propulsion, she was constructed at Buffalo, New York by David Bell Co. in 1871.  The Gallatin class consisted of two ships, the USRC Gallatin and the Hamilton, however they differed in the propulsion machinery used.

Between 1871 and 1898, the cutter operated along the eastern seaboard of the United States between Virginia and Massachusetts.  During that service, she operated from various bases including Boston, Massachusetts, Philadelphia, Pennsylvania and Norfolk, Virginia. During the Spanish–American War Hamilton assisted with the blockading of Havana harbor. After the war she was assigned duties out of Savannah, Georgia until 1903, when she was assigned duties along the Gulf Coast. That area remained her zone of operations for the remainder of her career and on 31 January 1906, Hamilton was placed out of commission at Mobile, Alabama. She was sold to Lee Kimball, of Mobile, on 6 March 1906 for $2,100 and was delivered to him on 26 March.

References
 U.S. Coast Guard and Revenue Cutters, 1790–1935, Donald L. Canney, Naval Institute Press, 1995

Ships of the United States Revenue Cutter Service